Våler is a municipality in Viken county, Norway.  The administrative centre of the municipality is Kirkebygden.  The parish of Vaaler was established as a municipality on 1 January 1838 (see formannskapsdistrikt).

General information

Name 
The Old Norse form of the name was Válir.  This is the plural form of váll which means "a clearing in the woods".  Prior to 1921, the name was written "Vaaler".

Coat-of-arms 
The coat-of-arms is from modern times.  They were granted on 20 June 1986.  The arms are based on the arms of the local Bolt family, who held several high functions in the 13th and 14th centuries. The arms are already seen in the seal of Agmund Berdorsson Bolt from 1400.  The arms show a blue background divided in half vertically.  On the left is half of a silver fleur-de-lis and on the right there are two yellow chevrons.

Våler Church
Våler Church (Våler kirke) is a medieval era church. The church was built in Romanesque style between 1150 and 1200. Over the years the church has been rebuilt and remodeled several times. One of the church's bells are probably cast before 1160. The altarpiece was given to the church in 1636.
The octagonal font and ceiling above originates from 1697 and is carved in wood. The paintings hanging on the west and north walls of the nave is from around 1790.

Minority population

Notable people 
 The Bolt family an aristocratic family in The Kingdom of Denmark-Norway from Østfold; it lasted from 1333 to 1580
 Albert Nordengen (1923 in Våler – 2004) a banker and well liked Mayor of Oslo, 1976 to 1990
 Dennis Olsen (born 1996 in Våler) a Norwegian racing driver

Gallery

References

External links 
 
 
 Municipal fact sheet from Statistics Norway
 

Municipalities of Østfold
Municipalities of Viken (county)
Villages in Østfold